Riverside Cemetery (established 1791) is a cemetery set in the "Old Union" district of Endicott, New York, owned and operated by The Union Presbyterian Church. Located at 400 Vestal Avenue, the cemetery has historical significance as the burial place of Joshua and John Mersereau, who fought with George Washington in the Revolutionary War.

It was listed on the National Register of Historic Places in 2004.

References

External links
 The Union Presbyterian Church (Endicott, New York)
 

Cemeteries on the National Register of Historic Places in New York (state)
Binghamton metropolitan area
Protestant Reformed cemeteries
Cemeteries in Broome County, New York
1791 establishments in New York (state)
National Register of Historic Places in Broome County, New York